John James McElligott  (August 25, 1882 – September 6, 1946) was appointed the 12th New York City Fire Commissioner by Mayor Fiorello H. La Guardia on January 1, 1934.

Biography

McElligott resigned his position by announcing his retirement on February 23, 1940. Mayor LaGuardia initially appointed Elmer Mustard as Fire Commissioner, but the next day, Mayor LaGuardia pronounced "null and void" the action taken by McElligott, and on February 27, 1940 McElligott resumed his position as Fire Commissioner. He continued on as the Fire Commissioner of the City of New York until his removal by LaGuardia as the result of a corruption scandal on May 8, 1941. He died on September 6, 1946 at Saint Clare's Hospital in Manhattan. His funeral mass was held at Saint Patrick's Cathedral with Cardinal Francis Spellman attending.

References

Commissioners of the New York City Fire Department
1882 births
1946 deaths